Kazakhstan International School (KIS) is a nonprofit international school in Almaty, Kazakhstan. KIS is an International Baccalaureate Primary Years Program (IB PYP), Middle Years Program (IB MYP) and Diploma Program (IB- DP) authorized school.

See also 

List of international schools
List of schools in Almaty

External links
 Kazakhstan International School
 IB Program

International schools in Kazakhstan
Educational institutions established in 1997
Education in Almaty
1997 establishments in Kazakhstan